Federal Air (incorporating Pelican Air Services) is an airline headquartered at O. R. Tambo International Airport near Johannesburg, South Africa.

It operates air shuttle, scheduled and charter services throughout Africa for business and tourism. Its main base is Johannesburg, with hubs at Kruger Mpumalanga International Airport, Nelspruit and Vilanculos Airport. Daily flights are operated to Kruger National Park and other parks and game reserves in South Africa and Zimbabwe.

History
The airline was founded as Comair Charters (Natal) and became branded as Federal Air (Fedair) in 1993. It later acquired and absorbed Pelican Air Services to provide scheduled air shuttle services in Southern Africa and to link remote bush lodges with Johannesburg.

Destinations 
Johannesburg - OR Tambo International Airport (hub)
Hoedspruit - Eastgate Airport
Mbombela - Kruger Mpumalanga International Airport (hub)
Phinda - Phinda Private Game Reserve (hub)
Pietermaritzburg - Oribi Airport
Sabi Sabi - Ulusaba Airstrip (hub)
Madikwe Game Reserve
Durban - Virginia Airport

Fleet
The Federal Air fleet included the following aircraft in October 2011:

References

External links

Airlines of South Africa
Companies based in Ekurhuleni
Kempton Park, Gauteng
Airlines established in 1989
1989 establishments in South Africa